E510 may refer to:
 Ammonium chloride, a food additive
 Olympus E-510, a camera